Brown County is a county in west-central Texas. As of the 2020 census, the population was 38,095. Its county seat is Brownwood. The county was founded in 1856 and organized in 1858. It is named for Henry Stevenson Brown, a commander at the Battle of Velasco, an early conflict between Texians and Mexicans.

The Brownwood, TX Micropolitan Statistical Area includes all of Brown County.

History
Indigenous peoples lived here for thousands of years before Europeans entered the area. The historic inhabitants were the Penteka (also known to the Europeans as Comanche), who occupied this area at the time of European colonization.
In 1721, the Marqués de San Miguel de Aguayo expedition is said to have passed through the county. 

In 1838, land surveys were made of the area. In 1856, Welcome W. Chandler from Mississippi became the first settler, arriving with his family, John H. Fowler, and seven slaves. They built a log cabin on Pecan Bayou. The county was formed from Comanche and Travis Counties. It is named after Henry Stevenson Brown, an American pioneer from Kentucky. In 1858, the county was formally organized.  Brownwood was designated as the county seat.

In 1874, John Wesley Hardin and gang celebrated his 21st birthday in Brown and Comanche Counties. Deputy Charles Webb drew his gun, provoking a gunfight that ended Webb's life. A lynch mob was formed, but Hardin and his family were put into protective custody. The mob broke into the jail and hanged his brother Joe and two cousins. Hardin fled.
The Fort Worth-Brownwood stage was robbed five times in two months of 1875.
Oil was discovered on the H. M. Barnes farm near Grosvenor in 1879.
Texas Rangers killed two fence cutters in 1886, in the ongoing battle between farmers and ranchers over fencing open range. By the next year, cotton had become the county's most important crop. Pulitzer-Prize winner Katherine Ann Porter was born in 1890 at Indian Creek.
The Fort Worth and Rio Grande Railway was built to the county in 1892. The Gulf, Colorado and Santa Fe Railway was built into Brownwood in 1895. In 1903, the GC&SF extended the line to Menard.

Also in 1903, the county voted itself a dry county. Alcohol did not become legal again until the 1950s.

In 1909, the boll weevil moved into the county, destroying the cotton economy. The first commercial production of oil came from the efforts of Jack Pippen at Brownwood in 1917. In 1926, an oil boom followed the success of the White well on Jim Ned Creek; some 600 wells were drilled in several fields in the county during this time.

In 1940, work began on Camp Bowie.  The first German prisoners of war arrived in 1943; many had been members of Erwin Rommel's Afrika Korps.

In 1889, Howard Payne College and Daniel Baker College were established in Brownwood.
They combined under the name Howard Payne College in 1953.

Geography

Major highways
  U.S. Highway 67
  U.S. Highway 84
  U.S. Highway 183
  U.S. Highway 377
  State Highway 279
  Farm to Market Road 45

Adjacent counties
 Eastland County (north)
 Comanche County (northeast)
 Mills County (southeast)
 San Saba County (south)
 McCulloch County (southwest)
 Coleman County (west)
 Callahan County (northwest)

Demographics

Note: the US Census treats Hispanic/Latino as an ethnic category. This table excludes Latinos from the racial categories and assigns them to a separate category. Hispanics/Latinos can be of any race.

As of the census of 2000, 37,674 people, 14,306 households, and 10,014 families resided in the county.  The population density was 40 people per square mile (15 per km2).  The 17,889 housing units averaged 19 per square mile (7 per km2).  The racial makeup of the county was 87.35% White, 4.01% Black or African American, 0.53% Native American, 0.37% Asian,  6.08% from other races, and 1.66% from two or more races. About 15.38% of the population was Hispanic or Latino of any race.

Of the 14,306 households in the county, 31.40% had children under the age of 18 living with them, 55.90% were married couples living together, 10.90% had a female householder with no husband present, and 30.00% were not families. About 26.50% of all households were made up of individuals, and 12.40% had someone living alone who was 65 years of age or older.  The average household size was 2.48 and the average family size was 2.98.

In the county, the population was distributed as 25.80% under the age of 18, 10.10% from 18 to 24, 24.70% from 25 to 44, 22.90% from 45 to 64, and 16.40% who were 65 years of age or older.  The median age was 37 years. For every 100, there were 97.40 males.  For every 100 females age 18 and over, there were 93.10 males.

The median income for a household in the county was $30,974, and for a family was $37,725. Males had a median income of $30,169 versus $19,647 for females. The per capita income for the county was $15,624.  About 14.00% of families and 17.20% of the population were below the poverty line, including 22.70% of those under age 18 and 12.10% of those age 65 or over.

Media
The Brownwood Bulletin is the local daily newspaper, an American Consolidated Media company that also serves media online through its website.  Brown County is part of the Abilene/Sweetwater/Brownwood television media market. Area television stations include KRBC-TV, KTXS-TV, KXVA, KTAB-TV, and KIDU-LD.

Communities

Cities
 Bangs
 Brownwood (county seat)
 Early

Town
 Blanket

Census-designated places
 Lake Brownwood
 Thunderbird Bay

Unincorporated communities
 Brookesmith
 Cross Cut
 Grosvenor 
 Indian Creek
 May
 Owens
 Winchell
 Zephyr

Ghost towns
 Byrds
 Dulin
 Fry
 Thrifty

Politics

See also

 National Register of Historic Places listings in Brown County, Texas
 Recorded Texas Historic Landmarks in Brown County

References

External links
 Brown County, Texas
 Brown County at the Handbook of Texas
 Brownwood News
 Brownwood Bulletin newspaper

 
1858 establishments in Texas
Populated places established in 1858